Richard Martyn (16301694) was a leading figure in early New Hampshire, in business, church and government.

Martyn was a merchant, and in 1671 he was one of the founders of the first church in Portsmouth. He served as selectman, as Commissioner for the Trial of Small Causes, and as Deputy to the General Court of New Hampshire (the legislature of New Hampshire). He was a Representative in 1672 and 1679, and chosen as Speaker of the House in 1692. He became Treasurer of the province by royal appointment, and later served as Chief Justice of the Superior Court of Judicature (the name of the New Hampshire Supreme Court at the time).

References

External links
 Portsmouth Historical Society website

1630 births
1694 deaths
Colonial American merchants
People from Portsmouth, New Hampshire
People of colonial New Hampshire
Members of the New Hampshire House of Representatives
American jurists